Garrett David Witts (born July 3, 1959) is an American former professional basketball player. He played in 46 games for the Washington Bullets in the National Basketball Association during the 1981–82 season. He scored 132 career points in the NBA.

References

External links
College statistics @ sports-reference.com

1959 births
Living people
American men's basketball players
Basketball players from New Jersey
Holy Cross Crusaders men's basketball players
Maine Lumberjacks players
Small forwards
Sportspeople from Elizabeth, New Jersey

Basketball players from Washington, D.C.

St. Joseph High School (Metuchen, New Jersey) alumni
Washington Bullets draft picks
Washington Bullets players